Sotero Francisco Montes Varela (born April 22, 1943, in Zacatecas) is a Mexican former football defender, who played for the Mexico national team between 1970 and 1971. He was part of the Mexico squad for the 1970 World Cup.

External links
 

1943 births
Association football defenders
Mexico international footballers
1970 FIFA World Cup players
Atlético Español footballers
Liga MX players
Footballers from Zacatecas
Living people
Mexican footballers